Beyond Verbal is an Israeli start-up company that claims to do Emotion recognition using vocal intonations.

Overview 
Beyond Verbal commercializes patented technology from 18 years of research by physicists and neuropsychologists into the mechanisms of human intonations. The company says that its technology enables machines to understand human emotions by analyzing raw voice intonations as people speak. This technology is based on research of over 70,000 subjects in more than 30 different languages, which led to the development of the app that extracts people's moods, attitudes and personality from the intonations of their voice.

History
Dr. Yoram Levanon and neuro-psychologist Dr. Lan Lossos founded the company.  The idea for Beyond Verbal came when Levanon began showing interest in how babies – who do not understand a single word – are able to figure out exactly what their caretakers feel toward them, they then studied over 60,000 test subjects in at least 26 languages, and their success in extracting, decoding, and measuring human moods, attitudes, and personalities gave birth to what they call Emotion Analytics.

Milestones 
 04.2012: Founding of Beyond Verbal Communication, Ltd.
 09.2012: Purchase of Key IP – Emotions Analytics technology, 17 years of research, 70,000 voices tagged in more than 30 languages, 3 patents
 05.2013: First seed investment of $2.8M
 06.2013: Launch of Moodies – Emotions Analytics web-based demo app
 07.2013: Follow on investment of additional $1 million
 09.2013: Launch of Emotions Analytics cloud-based API and first partner sign-up
 12.2013: Launch of first third-party solution
 01.2014: Launch of mobile Moodies iOS app
 06.2014: Partnership With Lieberman Research Worldwide (LRW) to integrate Emotions Analytics technology to enhance market research.

Investors 
Funding to date in Beyond Verbal totals $10.8 million. Investors include Singulariteam, Winnovation and The Siegel Group.

References

External links 
Company website

Companies based in Tel Aviv
Software companies of Israel